Antoine Rault (born 28 September 1965) is a French playwright and novelist.

The website - http://www.antoine-rault.com/

The Youtube channel - https://www.youtube.com/channel/UCtpks4Hn2b6BM8RkDd4BNnw

Rault’s works deal with contemporary and historical themes.

He was awarded the Grand Prix de l’Académie Française for his play Le Caïman about Marxist philosopher Louis Althusser, who killed his wife after 30 years of marriage.

Biography

Antoine Rault was born in Paris. In 1967, he graduated from the Institut d’Etudes Politiques de Paris, where he studied literature and politics.

Subsequently, Antoine Rault worked for 15 years as a ghostwriter for the chairman of an international company and several French politicians. He was also a public relations advisor for a French minister.

Although his first play La Première Tête, which deals with the French king Louis XVI and the beginning of the French revolution, had been performed in 1989, Antoine Rault had to wait until the success of his second play, Le Caïman, to become a full-time writer.

Works

Novels
Je veux que tu m’aimes (Albin Michel) 2010.
La vie dont tu rêvais (Albin Michel) 2014.
La danse des vivants (Éditions Albin Michel) 2016, La Grande Librairie.Prix Maurice Genevoix 2017
La traversée du paradis (Éditions Albin Michel) 2018.
L'espion idéal (le Livre de Poche) 2020.
De grandes ambitions (Éditions Albin Michel) 2020.
Monsieur Sénégal (Plon) 2022.

Theater Plays
La Première Tête (1989) - Comédie de Paris. 
Le Caïman (2005- 2007) - Théâtre Montparnasse, with Claude Rich. Published by Avant-Scène Théâtre.
Le Diable Rouge (2008- 2010) - Théâtre Montparnasse, with Claude Rich. Published by Avant-Scène Théâtre.
Le Démon de Hannah (2009) - Comédie des Champs-Elysées. Published by Editions Albin Michel.
La Vie sinon Rien (2009-2011). Comédie des Champs-Elysées. Published by Quatre Vents – l’Avant-Scène Théâtre.
L'Intrus (2011- 2012) - Comédie des Champs-Elysées, with Claude Rich Published by Editions Albin Michel.
Le Système (2015) - Théâtre Antoine, with Lorant Deutsch, Stéphane Guillon, Eric Metayer, Urbain Cancellier, Sophie Barjac, Marie Bunel, Stéphanie Caillol, Philippine Bataille. Published by Editions Albin Michel
Toi et tes rêves - creation for the Festival d'Avignon 2015, with Stéphanie Vicat and Gérôme Anger.
Un nouveau départ - creation for the Festival d'Avignon 2015, with Corinne Touzet and Christian Vadim. Previous creations abroad - Russia (Всё сначала, 2011) and Germany (Auf ein Neues, 2012, with Marion Kracht and Daniel Morgenroth). 2016 - Théâtre des Variétés with Corinne Touzet, Christian Vadim and Fanny Guillot. Published by Editions Albin Michel
La vie rêvée d'Helen Cox (2018) - Théâtre La Bruyière, with Christelle Reboul and Jean-Pierre Mickael. Published by Editions Albin Michel
Terminus (2018) - CADO d'Orléans, with Lorant Deutsch, Bernard Malaka, Maxime d'Aboville, Chloe Berthier, Valérie Alane. Published by Editions Albin Michel
Au Scalpel (2022) - Festival d'Avignon and Théâtre des Variétés, with Davy Sardou and Bruno Salomone. Published by L'Avant-scène

Awards

Le Caïman
Grand prix de l’Académie française 2006.
Five Molière Award nominations in 2006, including Best Play

Le Diable Rouge
Two Molière Awards in 2009.
Seven Molière Award nominations in 2009, including Best Play and Best Dramatist.
Nomination Globes de Cristal 2009

Le Démon de Hannah
Nomination Globes de Cristal 2010.
Molière Award nomination 2010.

Le Système
Three Molière Award nominations 2015

La danse des vivants
Prix Maurice-Genevoix 2017

External links

Articles
 
 
 http://www.lopinion.fr/5-janvier-2015/premiere-crise-financiere-lutte-pouvoir-coeur-piece-systeme-19999
 http://www.onsortoupas.fr/tag/antoine-rault/
 http://www.directmatin.fr/arts-vivants/2015-02-19/deutsch-et-guillon-dans-les-coulisses-de-la-finance-699927
 http://blog.ticketac.com/2015/02/le-systeme-humour-et-histoire-au-theatre-antoine/
 https://web.archive.org/web/20150402134702/http://www.alternatives-economiques.fr/john-law-2c-hier-et-aujourd-hui_fr_art_1351_71950.html
 http://larevuey.com/2015/03/le-systeme-sexplique-au-theatre-antoine/
 https://web.archive.org/web/20150402150656/http://www.culture-chronique.com/chronique.htm?chroniqueid=1296&typeid=3

Videos and Podcasts
 
 TF1 Interview TF1
 Albin Michel Interview with the Editor
 Europe 1 podcast "La banqueroute et le Regent"
 Le Systeme teaser
 La danse des vivants @ La Grande Librairie TVshow

References 

1965 births
Living people
20th-century French dramatists and playwrights
20th-century French novelists
21st-century French novelists
Writers from Paris
Sciences Po alumni
French male novelists
20th-century French male writers
21st-century French male writers